Kolkatay Kohinoor (2019, English: Kohinoor in Kolkata) is an Indian Bengali thriller movie directed by Santanu Ghosh and produced by Angurbala Films It was released on 15 March 2019.

Plot
There is some mystery and new historical facts behind the famous Koh-i-Noor diamond. Historians research whether it had any connection with Kolkata. A treasure hunt reveals several unknown facts.

Cast
 Soumitra Chatterjee
 Sabyasachi Chakraborty
 Indrani Dutta
 Barun Chanda
 Debdut Ghosh
Anup pan
 Ankita Majumder
 Mona Dutta

References

External links
 

Indian detective films
Bengali-language Indian films
2010s Bengali-language films
2019 films
2010s mystery films
Secret histories
Treasure hunt films
Films about jewellery
Golconda diamonds